Ashley J. Tellis (born 1961) is the senior fellow at the Carnegie Endowment for International Peace specializing in international security, defense, and Asian strategic issues.

References

External links
Official Website for Carnegie Endowment
Biography 

Balancing without Containment: A U.S. Strategy for Confronting China's Rise by Ashley J. Tellis

Living people
International relations scholars
1961 births